The Journal of Nuclear Medicine Technology is a quarterly peer-reviewed medical journal published by the Society of Nuclear Medicine and Molecular Imaging that focuses entirely on technology crucial to nuclear medicine, including quality assurance, radiation safety, and clinical applications of nuclear medicine. The journal was established in 1973 and the editor-in-chief is Kathy Thomas.

External links

Radiology and medical imaging journals
Publications established in 1973
Quarterly journals
English-language journals